The International Computer Science Institute (ICSI) is an independent, non-profit research organization located in Berkeley, California, United States. Since its founding in 1988, ICSI has maintained an affiliation agreement with the University of California, Berkeley, where several of its members hold faculty appointments.

Research areas
ICSI's research activities include Internet architecture, network security, network routing, speech and speaker recognition, spoken and text-based natural language processing, computer vision, multimedia, privacy and biological system modeling.

Research groups and leaders
 The Institute's director is Dr. Lea Shanley.
 SIGCOMM Award winner Professor Scott Shenker, one of the most-cited authors in computer science, is the Chief Scientist and head of the New Initiatives group.
 SIGCOMM Award winner Professor Vern Paxson, who leads network security efforts and who previously chaired the Internet Research Task Force.
 Professor Jerry Feldman is the head of the Artificial Intelligence Group.
 Adjunct Professor Gerald Friedland is the head of the Audio and Multimedia Group.
 Dr. Stella Yu is head of the Computer Vision Group.
 Dr. Serge Egelman is head of the Usable Security and Privacy Group.
 Dr. Steven Wegman is head of the Speech Group.

Notable members and alumni 
 Turing Award and Kyoto Prize winner Professor Richard Karp is an alumnus and former head of the Algorithms Group.
 Professor Nelson Morgan is a former director and former head of the speech group.
 Professor Trevor Darrell is an alumnus and former head of the Computer Vision Group.
 Professor Krste Asanovic, an ACM Distinguished Scientist, is an alumna and former head of the Computer Architecture Group.
  
 IEEE Internet Award winner Sally Floyd; connectionist pioneer Jerry Feldman; frame semantics and construction grammar pioneer Charles J. Fillmore and Collin F. Baker, who lead the FrameNet semantic parsing project; and Paul Kay, who published an influential study on the universality of color words.
 IEEE Internet Award winner Mark Handley founded the XORP open source router software project while at ICSI.

References

External links
Web page

Research institutes in California
Academic computer network organizations
Software companies based in California
Research institutes in the San Francisco Bay Area
Scientific organizations established in 1988
Non-profit organizations based in the San Francisco Bay Area
Organizations based in Berkeley, California
Software companies of the United States
Computer science institutes in the United States